Samrat is a 1954 Bollywood film directed by Najam Naqvi. The film featured Ajit, Rehana, Kamalesh Kumari and others.

Plot
The Diwan of a kingdom, Guman Singh, has connections with the leader of a pirate gang. Sagar and two of his friends Kanhaiya and Kanu learns of this connection from a wounded sailor. Bijli, a pub dancer, discovers this. Sagar informs the King but due to the power exerted by the Diwan who is engaged to the King's daughter, Rajakumari, he is jailed for giving false information. Rajakumari suspects Guman and visits the pirates' island in disguise. She learns the truth and tells her father about it. When the King called for Guman, he sensed the trouble and stages a coup. He imprisons the King and replaces him with a lookalike. Rajakumari is forced to dance in the pirates' ship. Sagar, who was earlier released, attacks the ship and frees Rajakumari. He then kills Guman in a sword fight and releases the real King from prison.

Cast

Ajit
Rehana
Kamlesh Kumari
Mumtaz Ali
Ram Singh
Sapru
S. L. Puri
Randhir
Bhujbal Singh

Production
The film was dubbed into Tamil under the title Kaadhal Parisu and was released in 1955. Ku. Ma. Balasubramaniam wrote the dialogues and lyrics.(Note: Not to be confused with Kadhal Parisu that featured Kamal Haasan and released in 1987.)

Soundtrack
Music was composed by Hemant Kumar and the lyrics were penned by Rajendra Krishan. Playback singers are Lata Mangeshkar, Geeta Dutt, Asha Bhosle, Mohammed Rafi and C. Ramchandra.

Hindi songs

Tamil songs

References

External links

Indian action adventure films
Pirate films
Films scored by Hemant Kumar
1950s action films
Hindi-language action films
1950s Hindi-language films
1950s action adventure films
Indian black-and-white films